False cognates are pairs of words that seem to be cognates because of similar sounds and meaning, but have different etymologies; they can be within the same language or from different languages, even within the same family. For example, the English word dog and the Mbabaram word dog have exactly the same meaning and very similar pronunciations, but by complete coincidence. Likewise, English much and Spanish mucho came by their similar meanings via completely different Proto-Indo-European roots, and same for English have and Spanish haber. This is different from false friends, which are similar-sounding words with different meanings, but which may in fact be etymologically related. 

Even though false cognates lack a common root, there may still be an indirect connection between them (for example by phono-semantic matching or folk etymology).

Phenomenon
The term "false cognate" is sometimes misused to refer to false friends, but the two phenomena are distinct. False friends occur when two words in different languages or dialects look similar, but have different meanings. While some false friends are also false cognates, many are genuine cognates (see False friends § Causes).  For example, English pretend and French prétendre are false friends, but not false cognates, as they have the same origin.

"Mama and papa" type

The basic kinship terms mama and papa comprise a special case of false cognates.

Examples
Note: Some etymologies may be simplified to avoid overly long descriptions.

Within English

Between English and other languages

Between other languages

False cognates used in the coinage of new words
The coincidental similarity between false cognates can sometimes be used in the creation of new words (neologization). For example, the Hebrew word  dal ("poor") (which is a false cognate of the phono-semantically similar English word dull) is used in the new Israeli Hebrew expression אין רגע דל en rega dal (literally "There is no poor moment") as a phono-semantic matching for the English expression Never a dull moment.

Similarly, the Hebrew word דיבוב dibúv ("speech, inducing someone to speak"), which is a false cognate of (and thus etymologically unrelated to) the phono-semantically similar English word dubbing, is then used in the Israeli phono-semantic matching for dubbing. The result is that in today's Israel, דיבוב dibúv means "dubbing".

See also

 Areal feature
 Convergent evolution
 Equivalence
 Etymological fallacy
 False etymology
 False friend
 Linguistic interference (language transfer)
 Pseudoscientific language comparison
 Semantic change
 Sprachbund

References

Further reading
 Rubén Morán (2011), 'Cognate Linguistics', Kindle Edition, Amazon.
 Geoff Parkes and Alan Cornell (1992), 'NTC's Dictionary of German False Cognates', National Textbook Company, NTC Publishing Group.

External links 
 Cognates.org 
 

Historical linguistics
Comparative linguistics
Etymology